

Ralph Baldock (or Ralph de Baldoc) was a medieval Bishop of London.

Baldock was elected on 24 February 1304, confirmed 10 May, and consecrated on 30 January 1306.

Baldock served as Lord Chancellor of England from 21 April 1307 to 2 August 1307. He licensed  Bow Church on 17 November 1311 as a chapel of ease. He died on 24 July 1313.

See also

 List of Lord Chancellors and Lord Keepers

Citations

References

Further reading
 Tipping, H. A. "‘Baldock, Ralph (d. 1313)’", rev. M. C. Buck, Oxford Dictionary of National Biography, Oxford University Press, 2004, accessed 8 November 2007

Bishops of London
Lord chancellors of England
1313 deaths
Year of birth unknown
Deans of St Paul's
14th-century English Roman Catholic bishops